Vande Mataram is a 1939 Indian Telugu-language film directed by B. N. Reddy and starring V. Nagayya and Kanchanamala. The story is based on Reddy's short story Mangala Sutra. The film was a box office success.

Cast 
Nagayya as Raghu
Kanchanamala as Janaki

References 

1939 films
1930s Telugu-language films